A number of ships were named La Orilla, including:

, built as Empire Envoy, in service 1952–55
, built as Mohawk Park, in service 1951–52

Ship names